Wael Horri (born 20 March 1982) is a Tunisian retired handball player and current coach.

Club career
In September 2005, he left team ES Sahel for playing in the Bundesliga for team TV Großwallstadt, where he played alongside Dominik Klein, Carsten Lichtlein and Alexander Petersson.

In 2010, he moved to France, where he played with Cesson Rennes MHB for two years, until he ended his career in 2012.

In France, he obtained a coaching license and managed a second division club, before being finally hired at TV Olpe in 2014, where he played for two championships as a player-coach.

Honours

National team
 10th place in 2000 Summer Olympics (Australia)
 4th place in 2012 Summer Olympics (United Kingdom)
 World Men's Handball Championship
 4th place in 2005 World Men's Handball Championship (Tunisia)
 World Cup Handball
 2006 World Cup silver medalist (Sweden)
 African Men's Handball Championship
 Silver medal in 2004 African Men's Handball Championship (Egypt)
 Gold medal in 2006 African Men's Handball Championship (Tunisia)

Club
Tunisian Handball League
 Winner: 2003, 2009, 2010
Tunisian Handball Cup
 Winner: 2007
Arab Handball Championship of Champions
 Winner: 2004

References

1982 births
Living people
Tunisian male handball players
Olympic handball players of Tunisia
Handball players at the 2000 Summer Olympics
Handball players at the 2012 Summer Olympics
Expatriate handball players
Tunisian expatriate sportspeople in France
Tunisian expatriate sportspeople in Germany
Handball-Bundesliga players
20th-century Tunisian people
21st-century Tunisian people